Juan Luis Bosch Gutiérrez (born 21 April 1952) is a Guatemalan businessman, a grandson of Spanish-born businessman Juan Bautista Gutiérrez as well as a son of Alfonso Bosch and Isabel Gutiérrez de Bosch, the late chairwoman of the Fundación Juan Bautista Gutiérrez.  He is married to Elvira Molina de Bosch and has 4 children. He is the chairman of CMI Capital, a part of CMI (Corporación Multi Inversiones), a family multi-Latin corporation founded in Guatemala in 1920.  CMI currently employs over 40,000 people in 14 countries in 3 continents, creating investment, jobs, and development in the region. During over 45 years, Juan Luis Bosch has led the corporation's growth and expansion strategies. He is currently a member of the board of directors of Banco Industrial and PRONACA, a leading Ecuadorian food  producer and distributor.

Academic background 
Juan Luis Bosch Gutiérrez graduated from High School from Liceo Javier in Guatemala. He studied Industrial-Mechanical Engineering at Universidad Rafael Landívar, also in Guatemala. He has also completed Business Administration and strategic planning studies.

Work experience 
His work experience includes:

1972-1974 Administration of Molinos Modernos, S. A. Guatemala.
1974 to date  Holding different positions in Multi-Inversiones S.A. Guatemala
1978 to date  Alternate Board Member of Banco Industrial S.A. Guatemala
Currently, Chairman of CMI Capital (Corporación Multi-Inversiones) Guatemala
With the Regional Group, overseeing investments in Central America, the Dominican Republic, Mexico, and franchise development in the United States
Food Industry (wheat flour derivatives, integrated poultry farming, Pollo Campero fast food restaurants), real estate development, finances, and hydroelectric power
Board member of Banco Industrial de Guatemala
Board member of Fundación Universidad del Valle De Guatemala
Founder of Siglo Veintiuno newspaper in Guatemala
Board member of various Regional Investment Companies
Board Member of Bain Consulting Mexico
Former Director of Telefónica de Centroamérica (TELCA)

Participation in several organizations 
Juan Luis Bosch Gutiérrez has led the Chamber of Industry of Guatemala (CIG) as well as the Coordinating Committee of Agricultural, Commercial, Industrial and Financial Associations (CACIF), the most important coordination body of the organized productive sector of Guatemala.

Juan Luis Bosch is a member of the Council of the Americas (COA), that gathers some of the top U. S. Blue Chip companies, and whose objective is to promote free trade, democracy and open trade in America. COA was established in 1963 under the name Business Group for Latin America, by David Rockefeller, at the behest of President John F. Kennedy.

Bosch Gutiérrez is also the founder of the  Central American Leadership Initiative (CALI), an effort, together with INCAE (the Central American Business Administration Institute), and the Aspen Institute, to improve future leaderships in Central America through networks that seek to provide support to develop the region.

He is the founder of CEAL– Business Council of Latin America - which was created around 1992, to form a community of business leaders interested in supporting the economic and social growth of Latin America.

He participated as a panelist in the XVI in the "Ibero-American Business Summit" in which energy, commerce and logistics were the main issues addressed.

He is presently a successful businessman who was recently portrayed, with CMI, in the Forbes magazine, on the occasion of the 100th anniversary of the corporation. There, he was interviewed by Hugo Salvatierra, editor-in-chief of the magazine, with his executive staff.

Public experience 
 President of CACIF Guatemala (1989).
 President of the Chamber of Industry of Guatemala.
 Leader of the Peace Accords CACIF Follow-up Commission
 Chair of Asociación de Avicultores de Guatemala -Poultry Farmers’ Association.
 Chair of Central America 2000 – an organization of Central American business leaders.
 Founder of FUNDESA – Fundación para el Desarrollo de Guatemala – (Foundation for the Development of Guatemala)
 Founder of Fundación DIG – Fundación para el Desarrollo Institucional de Guatemala – (Foundation for Institutional Development of Guatemala), promoting ESTNA Center.
 Member of the Board of Trustees of Universidad Del Valle de Guatemala.
 Founder of Fundación Juan Bautista Gutiérrez

References

External links
Corporación Multi Inversiones website
El Diario de Hoy article discussing CMI's size and its involvement with the construction of the Mall Pradera Concepción
Prensa Libre article regarding CMI's expansion into Costa Rica through its purchase of Propokodusa
Siglo XXI article regarding Fundación Juan Bautista Gutiérrez

Living people
1952 births
Guatemalan businesspeople